The 2016 Patriot League men's soccer tournament, was the 27th edition of the tournament. It determined the Patriot League's automatic berth into the 2016 NCAA Division I Men's Soccer Championship.

Colgate won the Patriot League title, making it their sixth Patriot League championship. The Raiders defeated American in the championship, 5–4 on penalties following a 1–1 draw after 110 minutes.

Seeding 

The top six programs qualified for the Patriot League Tournament.

Bracket

Awards

References 

2016
Patriot League Men's Soccer